Yessy Venisia Yosaputra (born 27 August 1994) is an Indonesian swimmer. She specializes in backstroke. She represented her country at the 2016 Summer Olympics.

References 

1994 births
Living people
Indonesian people of Chinese descent
Indonesian female swimmers
Olympic swimmers of Indonesia
Swimmers at the 2016 Summer Olympics
Female backstroke swimmers
Sportspeople from Bandung
Southeast Asian Games medalists in swimming
Southeast Asian Games gold medalists for Indonesia
Swimmers at the 2018 Asian Games
Competitors at the 2011 Southeast Asian Games
Competitors at the 2013 Southeast Asian Games
Competitors at the 2015 Southeast Asian Games
Competitors at the 2017 Southeast Asian Games
Southeast Asian Games silver medalists for Indonesia
Asian Games competitors for Indonesia
21st-century Indonesian women